Stanley Roy Goodridge (28 October 1928 – 29 September 2016) was a cricketer who played first-class cricket for Jamaica from 1950 to 1954.

A fast bowler, Stanley Goodridge made his first-class debut for Jamaica in 1950. In his fourth match, against British Guiana, he took 5 for 73 in the second innings in a Jamaican victory. Two seasons later he took 5 for 158 against British Guiana. In his next match, against the touring Indians, he took 6 for 28 with "hostile and accurate" fast bowling in the first innings to dismiss them for 140.

He played one further match for Jamaica in early 1954 before moving to County Durham in England to play as a professional for Seaham Park in the Durham County Cricket League. He played two non-first-class matches for Durham in 1956. In one, he took five wickets against Yorkshire, all of Test cricketers.

He married in 1952 fellow Jamaican Connie Mark MBE BEM (1923–2007), medical secretary and later an activist for West Indians in London, with whom he had a son and daughter. They later divorced.

References

External links
 
 Stanley Goodridge at CricketArchive

1928 births
2016 deaths
Sportspeople from Kingston, Jamaica
Jamaica cricketers
Jamaican cricketers